Andina, meaning Andean, may refer to:

Animals
 Acraga andina, a moth of family Dalceridae
 Agrotis andina, a moth of family Noctuidae
 Colobothea andina, a beetle of family Cerambycidae
 Euxesta andina, a fly of family Ulidiidae
 Mordella andina, a beetle of family Mordellidae
 Ommata andina, a beetle of family Cerambycidae
 Orthocomotis andina, a moth of family Tortricidae
 Stigmella andina, a moth of family Nepticulidae

Plants
 Acalypha andina, a plant of family Euphorbiaceae
 Mimosa andina, a legume of family Fabaceae
 Muhlenbergia andina, a grass of family Poaceae
 Neoholmgrenia andina, a flower of family Onagraceae
 Ochagavia andina, a plant of family Bromeliaceae
 Passiflora andina, a plant of family Passifloraceae
 Polybotrya andina, a fern of family Elaphoglossaceae
 Prumnopitys andina, an evergreen coniferous tree of family Podocarpaceae
 Vellozia andina, a plant of family Velloziaceae
 Xyris andina, a plant of family Xyridaceae

Other organisms
 Andina (lichen), a lichen genus in the family Teloschistaceae

Other uses
 Andina (album), a 1988 album by Argentine musician Dino Saluzzi
 Andina, Ambositra, a commune in Amoron'i Mania Region, Madagascar
 Andina (news agency), an agency owned by the Peruvian government
 Andina de Televisión or ATV (Peru), a Peruvian television network
 Fernando Andina (born 1976), Spanish actor